Morgan Henry Cathey (born June 12, 1984) is an American soccer player who played for Ikapa Sporting in the South African National First Division. Cathey is currently the head men's soccer coach at California State University, Stanislaus.

Cathey attended Azusa Pacific University in Azusa, California.  He obtained a BA in Youth Ministries in 2006. After a year of interning at a high school group at Pomona First Baptist Church, CA, Morgan and his wife Cari left for South Africa. While in South Africa, Morgan and Cari worked with the ministry Ambassadors in Sport. He also was a volunteer guest-speaker at St John’s Church youth group in South Africa. Cathey held the position of Assistant Men’s Soccer Coach at California State University Stanislaus.

Cathey is currently the men's soccer coach at Whitworth University. He led the Pirates to a Northwest Conference (D3) conference championship in his second season, and a trip to the Sweet 16. Cathey's Pirates have won the last three Northwest Conference titles. He recently graduated his first class of recruits.

Career 
Cathey spent the 2007–2008 season at Premier Soccer League club Ajax Cape Town as a backup to Hans Vonk. He made his debut for Ajax as a second-half substitute in a league match against Wits University FC on 31 October 2007.

In January 2020, it was announced that Cathey would be leaving Whitworth University to rejoin the Stanislaus State Warriors.

External links
 Stanislaus State biography
 Whitworth biography

References

1984 births
Living people
Azusa Pacific Cougars men's soccer players
American expatriate soccer players
Cape Town Spurs F.C. players
Association football goalkeepers
Cascade Surge players
Expatriate soccer players in South Africa
USL League Two players
Ikapa Sporting F.C. players
American soccer players
American expatriate sportspeople in South Africa
Soccer players from California
Sportspeople from Carlsbad, California
Whitworth Pirates men's soccer coaches
Expatriate soccer managers in South Africa
American expatriate soccer coaches
Stanislaus State Warriors men's soccer coaches